Esther Elvina Rose (April 1, 1901 – July 16, 1990)  was an American painter who worked in oils, collage, silkscreen and watercolors. She was best known for her impressionist renditions of California coastal images.

Early life
Esther Elvina Holbeck was born in Two Harbors, Minnesota. Esther's parents were John and Hilma Holbeck. John emigrated from Norway in 1883 and Hilma in 1880. Hilma was born in Norway however her parents were Swedish. The third of five children all born in the United States, Esther's siblings were Ingwald J., Alma Ingeborg, Hilmar Arnold and Carl Wallace. In 1910 the family lived in Waldo, Lake County, Minnesota. They lived in Two Harbors, Minnesota by 1920.

On July 9, 1921, Esther married Frank Archie Rose (1889-1968). Frank had served during World War I as a sergeant in the United States Army. He was an amateur photographer and had been a sports writer for the Two Harbors, Minnesota newspaper. They settled in San Diego, California in 1924 and that year established the first Karmelkorn Shoppe in San Diego.

Artistic career
Rose began painting at age 45. She studied under portraitist Frederick Taubes, seascape artist Bennett Bradbury and water color instructor J. Milford Ellison at the San Diego Art Institute.

She is particularly known for her seascapes of the California coast of an Impressionistic style, and she also made still life and landscape paintings. She painted with oils and watercolor. Aside from easel painting, Rose explored silk-screening, serigraphy, screenprinting, printmaking and collages.

Rose was a member of the West Coast Art Association, Central Coast Art Association, the Pacific Grove Art Association, in the Monterey area, and the Foothills Art Association in La Mesa, California.

Personal life
Esther and Frank had three children. Eugene Dennis Rose became the Orthodox Christian Hieromonk known as Seraphim Rose. Eileen Rose Busby was an author and antiques expert and Frank Rose was a businessman. Grandchildren include scientist J. Michael Scott, antiques expert Cordelia Mendoza, and true crime author Cathy Scott.

After the Roses retired, they moved to Carmel-by-the-Sea in Northern California. Her husband, Frank, died on July 30, 1968 and Esther Rose died in 1990 in La Mesa, California. Both are buried at the El Carmelo Cemetery, Pacific Grove, California.

Notes

References 

1901 births
1990 deaths
People from Two Harbors, Minnesota
20th-century American painters
American people of Norwegian descent
American people of Swedish descent
Artists of the American West
American women painters
American Impressionist painters
American landscape painters
Painters from California
20th-century American women artists
People from Carmel-by-the-Sea, California